Yong Saetae (Teochew: Dên Iong; ?–?) was a Chinese merchant and the father of King Taksin the Great. The Vietnamese called him Trịnh Yển (鄭偃).

His birth name was Dên Dag. Born in Chenghai County, Chaoshan, China. It was said that he was a broad-minded and unconventional man. "Dag, the ruffian" in Teochew). he came to Siam to do business, and became rich, and changed his name to Yong Saetae. Later, he became a tax-collector, and married a wealthy royal woman Nok-lang (later Princess Phithak Thephamat), who later gave birth to Taksin.

References

Year of birth missing
Year of death missing
18th-century Thai people
Yong Saetae
People from Chenghai
Thonburi Kingdom
Qing dynasty emigrants